H.O. Andrews Feed Mill, also known as Mapleton Farm and Garden, is a historic feed mill located at Mapleton in Huntingdon County, Pennsylvania. It was built in 1914, and is a 3 1/2-story frame building, measuring 40 feet by 35 feet. It sits on a concrete block foundation and has clapboard siding. Attached to the mill is a two-story frame addition, a coal and lumber storage shed, and one-story frame addition.

It was listed on the National Register of Historic Places in 1990.

References 

Industrial buildings and structures on the National Register of Historic Places in Pennsylvania
Industrial buildings completed in 1914
Buildings and structures in Huntingdon County, Pennsylvania
National Register of Historic Places in Huntingdon County, Pennsylvania